Mid-term parliamentary elections were held in Costa Rica on 13 April 1938. The result was a victory for the National Republican Party, which received 62.1% of the vote. Voter turnout was 70.8%.

Results

References

1938 elections in Central America
1938 in Costa Rica
Elections in Costa Rica